Cat-Iron, real name William Carridine ['Cat-Iron' was not his actual nickname, but a mishearing of his surname by his "discoverer"], (September 8, 1898 in Roxie, Mississippi United States – November 11, 1958 in Natchez, Mississippi) was an American blues singer and guitarist.

During the folk and blues revival, "Cat-Iron" was "discovered" and recorded in 1957 by Frederic Ramsey Jr.; the recordings were released in the United States in 1958 on the Folkways label, in the United Kingdom in 1969 on the XTRA label.
His song, "Jimmy Bell" has been covered by many other musicians, first by Koerner, Ray & Glover on their 1963 album, Blues, Rags and Hollers, later by Stoney & Meatloaf, The Numbers Band, Peter Lang, The Sharks, Tom Doughty and Watermelon Slim.

Discography
Cat-Iron Sings Blues And Hymns (Folkways, 1958)

References

External links
 Illustrated Cat Iron discography

1896 births
1958 deaths
African-American guitarists
20th-century African-American male singers
American blues singers
American blues guitarists
American male guitarists
20th-century American guitarists
Musicians from Louisiana
People from St. Mary Parish, Louisiana
People from Franklin County, Mississippi